Holly Bakke is an American attorney who served as Commissioner of the New Jersey Department of Banking and Insurance from 2002 to 2005 in the administration of Governor James E. McGreevey. She received a Bachelor of Arts (BA) from Drew University, a Masters in Business Administration (MBA) from Stevens Institute of Technology, and a Juris Doctor (J.D.) from Seton Hall Law School.  She also served as a trustee of New Jersey's Kean University. Following leaving her position as Commissioner, she began working with Strategic Initiatives Management Group, LLC as a Principal.

References

State cabinet secretaries of New Jersey
Drew University alumni
Stevens Institute of Technology alumni
Seton Hall University alumni
American women lawyers
American lawyers
Living people
Year of birth missing (living people)
21st-century American women